Castelo de Ranhados is a castle in Portugal. It is classified by IGESPAR as a Site of Public Interest.

Castles in Portugal